Ivanhoe is a 1982 British-American made-for-television historical romance film. An adaptation of Sir Walter Scott's 1819 novel of the same name, it stars Anthony Andrews in the title role. The film was directed by Douglas Camfield, with a screenplay written by John Gay. It depicts the noble knight Ivanhoe returning home from the Third Crusade and becoming involved in a power struggle for the throne of England.

Brian de Bois-Guilbert is treated more ambiguously than in most versions of the story.  He develops some genuine affection for Rebecca of York towards the end, and although he could easily have won the fight against the wounded and weakened Wilfred of Ivanhoe, Brian de Bois-Guilbert lowers his sword and allows himself to be killed, thus saving Rebecca's life.

Cast 
 Anthony Andrews – Sir Wilfred of Ivanhoe, Cedric's son.
 Sam Neill – Sir Brian de Bois-Guilbert
 Michael Hordern – Lord Cedric of Rotherwood
 James Mason – Isaac of York, Jewish money-lender.
 Olivia Hussey – Rebecca of York, Isaac's daughter.
 Lysette Anthony – Lady Rowena, Cedric's ward.
 Julian Glover – King Richard I Plantagenet, the Black Knight.
 Ronald Pickup – Prince John Plantagenet, Richard's brother and usurper.
 John Rhys-Davies – Sir Reginald Front-de-Boeuf
 Stuart Wilson – Sir Maurice de Bracy
 George Innes – Wamba (son of Witless), Cedric's jester.
 David Robb – Robert of Locksley, Robin Hood.
 Tony Haygarth – Friar Tuck.
 Michael Gothard – Sir Athelstane of Coningsburgh
 Philip Locke – Lucas de Beaumanoir, Grand Master of the Knights Templar.
 Timothy Morand – Prince John's Attendant
 Kevin Stoney – Fitzurse, Prince John's advisor.
 Dean Harris – Phillippe
 John Hallam – Herald
 Kenneth Gilbert – Marshall
 Debbie Farrington – Alicia
 Stewart Bevan – Edward, member of the Order of the Knights Templar.
 Geoffrey Beevers – Beaslin (as Geoffrey Veevers)
 John Forgeham – Front-de-Boeuf's Lieutenant
 Chloe Franks – Attendant
 Robert Russell – Leader
 Derek Lyons – Squire

Production 
The film was part of a slate of films from Columbia Pictures Television then under Herman Rush. Anthony Andrews' casting was announced in September 1981. "It's impossible to make Ivanhoe without being a bit tongue in cheek," said Andrews.

Michael Hordern said, "You could change our costumes from 12th Century to 20th Century and have us running about in automobiles instead of on horseback, and you could do the same story in terms of prejudice is still very strong. Human nature doesn't seem to have changed very much since Cedric's time."

It was filmed at Pinewood Studios and the historic Bamburgh Castle and Alnwick Castle in Northumberland.

"The problem with Ivanhoe is that he is whiter than white, cleaner than clean," said Andrews. "He's a straight-cut hero with no rough edge. Each time he opens his mouth he says something incredibly just. The problem was to turn him into a human being."

Julian Glover had played the role of Richard I previously in the Doctor Who serial The Crusade (1965), which was also directed by Camfield.

Broadcast and reception
The film premiered on CBS in the US on 23 February 1982 and was first broadcast in the UK on 26 September 1982 on ITV.

In Sweden, where it first aired over TV 1 on 31 December 1982 the film's airing annually around Christmas–New Year has become a tradition.

The score by Allyn Ferguson was nominated for an Emmy Award in 1982.

See also 
 List of American films of 1982

References

External links 

1982 television films
1982 films
British television films
Films based on Ivanhoe
Films set in the 12th century
Films set in England
Films shot at Pinewood Studios
Films with screenplays by John Gay (screenwriter)
Television shows based on Ivanhoe